Otar Giorgadze (born March 2, 1996) is a Georgian Rugby Union player. His position is flanker and he currently plays for Brive in the Top 14 and the Georgia national team.

References

1996 births
Living people
Rugby union players from Georgia (country)
Georgia international rugby union players
Rugby union locks
ASM Clermont Auvergne players